Cecil John Seddon Purdy  (27 March 1906 – 6 November 1979), often referred to as "C. J. S. Purdy", was an Australian chess player and writer. He was awarded the titles International Master in 1951 and Grandmaster of correspondence chess in 1959. Purdy was the inaugural world correspondence chess champion. He was also an influential chess magazine writer, editor, and publisher.

Early life
Purdy was born in Port Said, Egypt, where his father John Smith Purdy was stationed as a doctor in the Quarantine Service. When he was a child, Purdy moved with his family to New Zealand, and then to Tasmania, Australia, before they settled in Sydney when he was 12, where he was educated at Cranbrook School. While in Tasmania, one of his classmates was future film star Errol Flynn.

Career
Purdy began his chess career at the age of 16, and he soon decided to become a full-time chess writer and player. Initially an over-the-board (OTB) player, he soon began to mix OTB play with correspondence play. He was a four-time winner of the Australian Chess Championship, in 1935, 1937, 1949, and 1951. He won the first two Australian Correspondence Chess Championships, in 1938 and 1945. He also won the New Zealand Chess Championship in 1924/25.  In Auckland of 1952, Purdy drew a hard-fought match with Ortvin Sarapu, at the time by far the best player in New Zealand. They were thus declared Australasian co-champions.

Purdy founded and edited the magazine Australasian Chess Review (1929–1944); this became Check (1944–45), and finally Chessworld (1946–1967). He was described by Bobby Fischer as being a great chess instructor. Some of his writings are still in print. A famous remark of his is "Pawn endings are to chess what putting is to golf." 

In 1976 he was awarded the Order of Australia for services to chess.

Personal life
He was married in 1934 to Anne Crakanthorp (1915–2013), the daughter of two-time Australian Chess Champion Spencer Crakanthorp. The marriage produced two children, John (1935–2011) and Diana. John Purdy followed in his father's (and grandfather's) footsteps in winning the Australian Chess Championship in 1955 and 1963. Diana was also a keen chess player, and she married leading New Zealand player Frank Hutchings in 1960.

Death

On 6 November 1979, Purdy collapsed, while playing chess in a tournament at the Chess Centre of New South Wales and died later that day in the Sydney Hospital. He was survived by his wife, daughter and son John, who twice won the Australian Chess Championship. Purdy was cremated.

Published works

References

Further reading
J. Hammond and R Jamieson, C.J.S. Purdy: His Life, His Games and His Writings, Belmont Printing Co. Melbourne 1982
 C.J.S.Purdy, Frank Hutchings and Kevin Harrison, How Purdy Won: The Correspondence Chess Career of a World Champion, Castle Books 1983,

External links 
 
 
 Purdy, Cecil John Seddon (1906 - 1979), Australian Dictionary of Biography - Online Edition
 "C.J.S. Purdy" by Edward Winter
 

1906 births
1979 deaths
Chess International Masters
Correspondence chess grandmasters
World Correspondence Chess Champions
New Zealand chess players
Australian magazine editors
Australian chess players
Australian chess writers
People from Port Said
Australian people of Irish descent
Australian expatriates in New Zealand
Egyptian emigrants to Australia
Writers from Sydney
People educated at Cranbrook School, Sydney
Members of the Order of Australia
20th-century chess players
20th-century Australian journalists